Deb Margolin is an American performance artist and playwright.  She came to prominence in the 1980s in the feminist political theatre troupe Split Britches, which she co-founded with Lois Weaver and Peggy Shaw. Margolin has since created a string of one-woman shows.  A compilation of her texts, Of All The Nerve: Deb Margolin SOLO, was published in 1999 by Cassell/Continuum Press. Literary theorist Lynda Hart edited and wrote a commentary on each piece.

Margolin was the recipient of a 1999-2000 Obie Award for Sustained Excellence in Performance. In 2005, Margolin won the Joseph Kesselring Prize for her play, Three Seconds in the Key, a multi-character play which reflected her own experiences with Hodgkin's Disease.

She currently teaches playwrighting and performance as an associate professor at Yale University. Her  work includes O Yes I Will, a detailed account of her experiences and insights on being under general anaesthesia.

Margolin was forced to revise her 2010 play Imagining Madoff after legal threats from Elie Wiesel, who is one of Bernard Madoff's victims and had called Madoff a "scoundrel" but had refused to allow a character representing him and using his name to be used in the play.

In the 1990s, Margolin participated in the Zale-Kimmerling Writer in Residence program at Tulane University in New Orleans, LA. She later donated a large quantity of her personal materials such as journals, manuscripts, newspaper articles, flyers, ephemera, poetry, and correspondence to the Newcomb Archives at Tulane in August, 2018, forming the Deb Margolin Collection which spanned from the years of 1970 to 2016.  In the Spring of 2020, an exhibit was later shown at Tulane University entitled "Deb Margolin's Performance Composition: Writing and Embodying" which focused on Margolin's process of performance composition by displaying her notes and writing (both handwritten and typed) from her time as a university professor, actor, and playwright.

Works

 The God Show (1982)
 Coupla Weirdos (1986)
 In a Vacuum (1988)
 What's with Hamlet? (1989)
 Of All the Nerve (1989)
 You Don't Even Know Where the Strike Zone Is (1990)
 970-DEBB (1990)
 Gestation (1991)
 Lesbians Who Kill (1992)
 The Breaks (1993), written with Rae C. Wright
 Of Mice, Bugs and Women (1994)
 Carthieves! Joyrides! (1995)
 Bearing Witnesses (1996)
 O Wholly Night & Other Jewish Solecisms (1996)
 Critical Mass (1997)
 Bringing the Fishermen Home (1998)
 Three Seconds in the Key (2001)
 Rock, Scissors, Paper (2002)
 Three Seconds in the Key (2002)
 Why Cleaning Fails (2002)
 Index to Idioms (2003)
 Three Seconds in the Key (2004)
 The Rich Silk Of It (2005)
 Time Is The Mercy of Eternity (2006)
 Clarisse and Larmon (2006)
 O Yes I Will (2006)
 Imagining Madoff (2010)
  The Actor and the Text: Macbeth (2017)

References

External links
Official Website of Deb Margolin

American dramatists and playwrights
American performance artists
Feminist theatre
Year of birth missing (living people)
Living people
Jewish American artists
Yale University faculty
21st-century American Jews